The East Timor–Indonesia border is the international border between East Timor and Indonesia. The border consists of two non-contiguous sections totalling 253 km (157 m) in length, the larger section of which divides the island of Timor in two.

Description

Western (Oecusse) section
The Municipality of Oecusse forms an exclave of East Timor in Indonesian West Timor (part of East Nusa Tenggara province). The border starts in the west at the coast of the Savu Sea, proceeding overland to the south to the Noel Besi River, which it then follows south, then east, then south. The border then turns east overland briefly, before turning to the north, utilising various rivers such as the Ekan, Sonau and Bilomi, before proceeding northwards overland to the Savu coast.

Eastern section
The border between Indonesia and the main part of East Timor starts in the north at the Savu Sea coast, and proceeds south and then east via the Talu river. It then turns south along the Malibacu river, and then west along the Tafara river, then south along the Massin river down to the coast at the Timor Sea.

History

The division of the island of Timor dates to the colonial period. During the 15th–16th centuries both the Netherlands and Portugal began taking an interest in the Spice Islands of modern Indonesia. In the 17th century the Dutch occupied the western half of the island as part of its Dutch East Indies colony. In 1702 Portugal occupied eastern Timor and declared the creation of Portuguese Timor. On 20 April 1859 a treaty was signed (ratified 1860) which formally divided the island between the Netherlands and Portugal, with a border based on existing Timorese states which were assigned to either Portugal or the Netherlands. An additional treaty was then signed 10 June 1893 (ratified 1894) by which a more exact boundary was to be determined, with a joint commission starting work in 1898. However, there were numerous areas of the boundary which the two sides were unable to come to agreement on, prompting a further conference held at The Hague in 1902. A treaty was subsequently signed on 1 October 1904 (ratified 1908) which created the modern boundary, removing a number of enclaves whilst leaving the exclave of Oecusse as part of Portuguese Timor. However, whilst demarcating the boundary on the ground in 1909, the two sides were unable to agree to the alignment of the eastern section of the Oecusse boundary. The dispute was submitted to the Permanent Court of Arbitration in 1913, which decided on the matter in favour of the Netherlands on 26 June 1914. In 1915 various overland sections of the boundary were demarcated on the ground by erecting boundary posts.

The Dutch East Indies gained independence as Indonesia in 1949, however Portugal kept their colony on Timor. Following a revolution in Portugal which removed the dictatorship of Marcello Caetano, the country made moves to grant its remaining colonies independence. This sparked political turmoil in Portuguese Timor, and in 1975 Indonesia invaded and annexed the territory. An East Timorese independence movement opposed Indonesian rule, and in 1999 a referendum was held at which the East Timorese voted overwhelmingly for independence, which was accordingly granted in 2002.

Border crossings
 Wini (IDN) – Sacato (sometimes spelled Sakato) (TLS)
 Motamasin (IDN) – Salele (TLS)
 Mota'ain (IDN) – Batugade (TLS)

Gallery

See also
 East Timor–Indonesia relations

References

Further reading
 

 
border
Borders of Indonesia
International borders